Elaphanthera baumannii is a species of hemiparasitic shrub in the Santalaceae family. It is endemic to New Caledonia and the only species of the genus Elaphanthera, probably related to Exocarpos.

References

Endemic flora of New Caledonia
Santalaceae
Monotypic Santalales genera
Parasitic plants